The Naval School is a higher education level naval academy in Alfeite, Portugal. The Naval School is located in the Lisbon Naval Base premises, located on the south bank of the Tagus river, in front of the city of Lisbon.

The school offers university and polytechnical graduate programmes intended to train the future officers of the Portuguese Navy. It also offers postgraduate programmes, these being open to civilians, as well to naval and other military personnel.

History
The present Portuguese Naval School was created in the 18th century as the Royal Academy of the Midshipmen (Academia Real dos Guardas-Marinhas).

In 1782, the Company of Midshipmen (Companhia dos Guardas-Marinhas) was created to frame and train the midshipmen (naval officer candidates) of the Portuguese Navy. The Company of Midshipmen was installed in the building of the Naval Arsenal of Lisbon.

The Royal Academy of the Midshipmen was created in 1792, as a university-level naval academy. This Academy integrated the already existing Company of Midshipmen as its student corps.

In 1807, the Army of Napoleon invaded Portugal. In order not to be captured by the Napoleonic forces and maintain the independence of the Kingdom, the Portuguese Royal Court and government are transferred to the Portuguese colony of Brazil, continuing to rule from there. The Royal Academy of the Midshipmen and its Company of Midshipmen also embark in the naval fleet that carries the Royal Court to Brazil and are installed in Rio de Janeiro, in 1808.

In 1823, one year following the independence of Brazil, the faculty and the students of the Academy of the Midshipmen had to choose either the Brazilian or the Portuguese nationality. Those that chose the Portuguese nationality returned to Portugal and the others remained in Brazil. Then, two academies come into existence: the Imperial Academy of Midshipmen (Academia Imperial dos Guardas-Marinhas) in the Empire of Brazil (that would become the present Brazilian Naval School) and the Royal Academy of Midshipmen in the Kingdom of Portugal.

The Portuguese Royal Academy of Midshipmen was reorganized in 1845, becoming the Naval School (Escola Naval).

Organization
The Portuguese Naval School includes:
 Commanding officer - a rear-admiral;
 Deputy commanding officer - a naval captain;
 Scientific Council;
 Pedagogical Council;
 Board of School Discipline;
 Naval Research Center (CINAV);
 Office for the Coordination of Evaluation;
 Directorate of Teaching;
 Student Corps - a battalion composed of five cadet companies;
 Support services.

Academics

University graduate programmes
 Master in naval military sciences, Navy speciality (5 years)
 Master in naval military sciences, Naval administration speciality (5 years)
 Master in naval military sciences, Marines speciality (5 years)
 Master in naval military sciences, Naval engineering (mechanics) speciality (5 years)
 Master in naval military sciences, Naval engineering (weapons and electronics) speciality (5 years)
 Master in naval military sciences, Naval medicine speciality (only the part of naval training, the medicine studies being done in the Faculty of Medicine of the University of Lisbon)

Polytechnical graduate programmes
 Bachelor, Administration and secretariat (3 years)
 Bachelor, Weapons and electronics (3 years)
 Bachelor, Mechanics (3 years)
 Bachelor, Marines (3 years)
 Bachelor, Computer science (3 years)
 Bachelor, Divers (3 years)
 Bachelor, Hydrography (3 years)
 Bachelor, Communications (3 years)

Postgraduate programmes
 Postgraduate in hyperbaric medicine
 Postgraduate in law and cybersecurity
 Master in maritime history
 Master in military history

Other programmes
 Training program for special duty officers
 Training program for limited duty Officers
 Basic training program for officers

Research and development
The Portuguese Naval School includes the Naval Research Center (CINAV, Centro de Investigação Naval) that has the responsibility of coordinating, developing and supporting naval research activities.
Some research projects being developed at the CINAV are:
 Submarine acoustics;
 Light weapons;
 Electroencephalogram analysis;
 Georeferenced data analysis;
 Naval unmanned air vehicles;
 Marine machines maintenance.

External links
Naval School

References

Portuguese Navy
Higher education in Portugal
Naval academies
Educational institutions established in 1845
Military academies of Portugal
1845 establishments in Portugal
Military of Portugal